The Rivière du Nord (in English: river of the North) is a tributary of Muskrat River (via Lake Bolduc) which flows downstream to Grand lac Saint François, on the South Shore of the St. Lawrence River. The course of the "rivière du Nord" crosses the territory of the municipality of Adstock, in the Les Appalaches Regional County Municipality, in the administrative region of Chaudière-Appalaches, in Quebec, Canada.

Geography 
From Bolduc Lake, the Muskrat River flows on  towards the southwest in a forest environment, collecting water from the Poulin and Rodrigue rivers and passing east of the village of Saint-Daniel, up to its mouth.

Toponymy 
The toponym "Rivière du nord" was officially registered on August 4, 1969, at the Commission de toponymie du Québec.

See also 

 List of rivers of Quebec

References 

Les Appalaches Regional County Municipality
Rivers of Chaudière-Appalaches